Sydney, the largest city in Australia, has an extensive network of passenger and freight railways. The passenger system includes an extensive suburban railway network, operated by Sydney Trains, a metro network and a light rail network. A dedicated freight network also exists. Future expansion of the light rail network includes the Parramatta Light Rail. Existing light rail services are the Inner West Light Rail and the CBD & South East Light Rail.

Central station is the major terminus for Sydney Trains suburban services, while Sydney Terminal (now also known as Central Station) serves NSW TrainLink regional and intercity services. Sydney's light rail network also passes through Central. Journey Beyond's Indian Pacific train service to Perth also departs from here.

Sydney's suburban rail network is the busiest in Australia, with over 359 million journeys made in the 2017-18 financial year.

Passenger service

Suburban rail services in Sydney have been operated since 2013 by Sydney Trains. Most trains do not operate between midnight and 4.30am. Suburban services operate along the portions of the main lines from Sydney to the north, west, south and south-west, and also along several dedicated suburban lines. All of these lines are electrified at overhead 1500 V DC, starting in 1926. Some of the suburban stations are also served by the intercity and regional trains operated by NSW TrainLink.

Most suburban services operate through central Sydney via the underground City Circle (not a true circle line but a two-way loop extending under the CBD from Central station), the Eastern Suburbs line, or over the Harbour Bridge. There have been long-term plans for a further underground line passing beneath Pitt Street to a new harbour crossing. This is currently under construction as part of the Sydney Metro City & Southwest and expected to be completed in 2024.

Timetables are published for all lines, and most lines run on minimum frequencies of every 15 minutes from early morning to midnight, 7 days a week. Frequencies are higher during peak periods and over shared routes. Although frequencies match metro style operation in the city core, few Sydneysiders use the underground network as a metro, most journeys being commuter trips from suburbs into the central city area. An exception to this is the Eastern Suburbs line which serves the high density inner eastern suburbs and opened in 1979.

Rolling stock

All suburban passenger trains in Sydney are electric multiple units.

Upon electrification in the 1920s Sydney operated single-deck multiple units, but these were progressively withdrawn from the 1960s until their demise in 1993. Single-deck automatic trains were reintroduced to Sydney in May 2019, with the completion of the Sydney Metro Northwest.

Double-deck trailer carriages were delivered to the NSW Government Railways in the 1960s, and incorporated into sets with single-deck power cars. When coupled with the double decker trailer carriages, they formed the world's first fully double decker electric multiple unit trains. The majority of suburban passenger trains in Sydney today are double-deck multiple units.

Depots
Electric cars are maintained at depots at Hornsby in the northern suburbs, Mortdale in the southern suburbs, and Flemington in the western suburbs. A depot at Punchbowl in the southwest closed in 1994 and has since been demolished. These four depots were all built and opened with the opening of electrified services in the 1920s.

Heavy maintenance of passenger cars was carried out at the Electric Carriage Workshops, Chullora and Suburban Car Workshops, Redfern. Heavy maintenance is now contracted out to Maintrain, a UGL Rail subsidiary, with workshops at Clyde.

Freight services
Freight services operate over most of the suburban railway lines in Sydney, however due to the high frequency of passenger services and the lack of freight only tracks, there is a curfew on freight movements during peak hours.

The major interstate freight routes are the Main Southern and Main North lines, with the Illawarra and Main Western lines serving lineside industries and as alternate interstate routes. In the inner city area the Metropolitan Goods lines connects major freight terminals to the main passenger lines and the Southern Sydney Freight Line which runs parallel to the Main South line from the western end of the Metropolitan Goods lines to a point beyond the end of suburban services. The Northern Sydney Freight Corridor is a series of projects along the Main Northern line between Sydney and Newcastle aimed at increasing the number of freight trains operating along the route, by separating passenger and freight traffic.

The main traffic is containerised freight. The main intermodal terminal are at Leightonfield, Yennora and Minto. Coal services to Port Kembla are another major traffic. Freight operators include Crawfords Freightlines, Independent Rail, Pacific National, Qube Holdings and SCT Logistics.

History

The first railway in Sydney was opened in 1855 between Sydney and Granville, now a suburb of Sydney but then a major agricultural centre. The railway formed the basis of the New South Wales Government Railways. Passenger and freight services were operated from the beginning. By 1880, there was half hourly service to Homebush.

In 1884, the railway opened from Strathfield to Hornsby. The North Shore line opened in 1893 to a harbour side station at Milson's Point, and was originally built because parliament thought it would be a shorter route for country produce from the north to Sydney Harbour (a role it has never fulfilled). Sydney's first deliberately suburban railway was a line to Belmore which opened in 1896 and was soon extended to Bankstown.

Sydney's suburban passenger service was severely hampered by the inconvenient location of its city terminus, at a site south of Devonshire Street. Most of Sydney's population was well served by trams, and the suburban railways had a relatively small initial role to play. This was to change in the 1920s.

The railway system as it exists today is really the result of the vision and foresight of John Bradfield, one of Australia's most respected and famous civil engineers. He was involved in the design and construction of Sydney underground railways in the 1920s and 1930s, but he is more famous for the associated design and construction of the Sydney Harbour Bridge. Bradfield's vision for metro-style subways in Sydney was inspired by the subways he observed in Paris, London and New York City.

Electrification

New South Wales uses an overhead electrification system at 1,500 volts direct current. Whilst inferior to and more expensive than modern single phase alternating current equipment, it was in vogue during the 1920s, having been used in Melbourne since 1919 and is generally sufficient for the operation of electric multiple unit trains. However, the introduction of powerful electric locomotives in the 1950s, followed by the Millennium train in 2002, revealed drawbacks in this antiquated system of electrification. As the voltage is relatively low, high currents are required to supply a given amount of power, which necessitates the use of very heavy duty cabling and substation equipment. Until the retirement of electric locomotives from freight service in the 1990s, it was often necessary to observe a "power margin" to ensure that substations were not overloaded. This situation was similar to that which applied to The Milwaukee Road's 3,000 VDC electrification. Plans to electrify the Hunter Valley at 25 kV alternating current were abandoned in the 1990s.

Electrification came to Sydney's suburbs on 9 December 1926 with the first suburban electric service running between Central station and Oatley on the Illawarra line. In the same year, the first underground railway was constructed north from Central station to St James in Sydney's central business district. Electric trains that had previously terminated at Central station continued north, diving underground at the Goulburn Street tunnel portal, stopping at Museum station and then terminating at St James. Other lines were soon electrified. Also, in conjunction with the construction of the Sydney Harbour Bridge which opened in 1932, an additional four-track underground line was constructed from Central station to Town Hall and Wynyard. Two of the tracks continued over the Harbour Bridge connecting to the North Shore line.

It was only in 1956 that the two tracks terminating at Wynyard were linked to the line terminating at St James via the Circular Quay viaduct. This new arrangement, dubbed the City Circle, allowed services to make a continuous run through the city and return to the suburbs without having to terminate.

Electrification timeline
 1926 – Illawarra line to Royal National Park, Bankstown line, City Circle
 1927 – North Shore line
 1929 – Western line to Parramatta
 1929 – Northern line (Strathfield to Hornsby)
 1929 – South line to Liverpool
 1936 – Carlingford line from Clyde to Rosehill
 1955 – Parramatta to Penrith
 1957 – Penrith to Lithgow
 1959 – Rosehill to Carlingford
 1959 – Hornsby to Cowan
 1960 – Cowan to Gosford
 1968 – Liverpool to Campbelltown
 1975 – Blacktown to Riverstone
 1980 – Loftus to Waterfall
 1982 – Gosford to Wyong
 1984 – Wyong to Newcastle
 1985 – Waterfall to Port Kembla.
 1985 – Macarthur station opened
 1991 – Riverstone to Richmond
 1996 – Coniston to Dapto
 2002 – Dapto to Kiama

New electrified lines were built:

 1926 – line from Central to St James station and Museum opened
 1931 – line opened to East Hills
 1932 – line from Central to Town Hall, Wynyard, the Sydney Harbour Bridge, Milsons Point station and North Sydney station opened
 1939 – Line to Cronulla built and connected with the Illawarra line at Sutherland
 1956 – Circular Quay station opened completing the City Circle
 1979 – Eastern Suburbs railway completed to Bondi Junction
 1987 – East Hills – Glenfield line opened
 1996 – Y-link built between Harris Park and Merrylands allowing the introduction of Cumberland line services from Campbelltown to Blacktown
 1998 – line from Flemington and Lidcombe to Olympic Park.
 2000 – line to Sydney Airport and Wolli Creek built as a public-private partnership by the Airport Link Company
 2009 – Epping to Chatswood railway line opened
 2015 – South West Rail Link opened
 2019 – Sydney Metro Northwest opened

Organisation

The rail network in the metropolitan area of Sydney is owned, maintained and operated by Transport Asset Holding Entity, a NSW State Government owned corporation. Third party access to their tracks by other freight operators is allowed under an open-access arrangement. Track outside the Sydney metropolitan area is operated and maintained by the Australian Rail Track Corporation. Suburban passenger trains within Sydney are operated by Sydney Trains and long-distance trains that run through Sydney are operated by NSW TrainLink.

RailCorp was formed on 1 January 2004 by the merger of the State Rail Authority (SRA) and the metropolitan functions of the Rail Infrastructure Corporation (RIC). Until 1972, railways in NSW were operated by the Department of Railways New South Wales until this department was replaced by the Public Transport Commission (PTC), which was also responsible for bus and ferry services. In 1980 the PTC was broken up into the SRA, responsible for rail services, and the Urban Transit Authority (UTA), responsible for bus and ferry services. The UTA later became the State Transit Authority in 1989.

In 2001, the SRA had its 'above track' operations separated from its track ownership and maintenance operations. The track maintenance operations and track ownership were moved to the new RIC. However this separation into a horizontally operated rail system was criticised for the passing of blame for rail delays and accidents between authorities, and in 2004 railways in Sydney became a vertically operated system again with the creation of RailCorp, a fusion of the SRA and the urban sections of the RIC.

In July 2013, RailCorp was reduced to become the owner of the infrastructure and rolling stock, with the service provision that it operated under the CityRail and CountryLink brands transferred to Sydney Trains and NSW TrainLink.

Gauge

Terminology
The railways in Sydney generally use British-derived terminology.
 Points refers to what in American English are known as railroad switches, or crossovers.
 Up refers to the direction "towards Sydney", where 'Sydney' is generally defined as Central Station.
 Down refers to the direction "away from Sydney", or "towards the country".
 Signal box refers to the signal control installation (tower in American terminology).

Railway lines

Mainlines
Four main 'trunk' lines radiate from Sydney to the north, south, west, and southwest:
 The Main Western railway line from Central through Strathfield and west to Penrith and western NSW.
 The Main North railway line from Strathfield north to Hornsby and on to northern NSW
 The Main Southern railway line from Lidcombe through Regents Park and Cabramatta and southern NSW
 The South Coast railway line (also known as Illawarra railway line) from Redfern south to Sutherland and on to Wollongong and the South Coast.

Other suburban lines
Other passenger lines branch from or interconnect with the four main lines:
 The Airport Link, an underground line linking the airport to the city.
 The Bankstown railway line, from Sydenham to Lidcombe via Bankstown
 The City Circle, a mostly underground loop in central Sydney
 The Cronulla railway line, from Sutherland to Cronulla
 The East Hills railway line, from Tempe to Glenfield via East Hills.
 The Eastern Suburbs railway line, a mostly underground line from Central to Bondi Junction
 The North Shore railway line, from Central to Hornsby via the Harbour Bridge
 The Old Main South railway line, from Granville to Cabramatta via Fairfield
 The Olympic Park railway line, a balloon loop line between Lidcombe and Olympic Park
 The Richmond railway line, from Blacktown to Richmond
 The South West Rail Link, from Glenfield to Leppington.

Rapid transit lines
 The Sydney Metro Northwest, from Tallawong to Chatswood
 Includes the converted Epping to Chatswood rail link, an underground line connecting the North Shore and Main Northern lines, and serving the Macquarie Park employment area.

Light rail lines 

Lines with light rail specifications:
 The Dulwich Hill Line (otherwise known as the Inner West Light Rail), from Central to Dulwich Hill. Mostly runs along a former section of the Metropolitan Goods Railway.
CBD and South East Light Rail (abbreviated to CSELR) from Circular Quay to Randwick and Kingsford. The Randwick branch opened in December 2019, whilst the Kingsford branch opened in April 2020.
 The Royal National Park line, operated by the Sydney Tramway Museum, terminating at Royal National Park railway station. Previously operated as part of the Eastern Suburbs & Illawarra railway line.

Goods lines

Several railway lines carry goods only:
 The Metropolitan Goods Railway from Flemington/Sefton to Port Botany, with former branches from Dulwich Hill to Rozelle Yard and from Lilyfield to Sydney Yard via Darling Harbour.
 The Southern Sydney Freight Line between Macarthur and Sefton, where it connects with the Metropolitan Goods Line.
 Northern Freight Pass between Thornleigh and Epping turning onto Strathfield line.

Closed lines
There are several closed lines in Sydney:
 The Camden Line, from Campbelltown to Camden
 The Carlingford Line, from Clyde to Carlingford
 The Potts Hill Line in Potts Hill
 The Richmond-Kurrajong Line from Richmond to Kurrajong
 The Rogans Hill Line from Westmead to Rogans Hill
 The Rookwood Cemetery Line serving Rookwood Cemetery
 The Ropes Creek Line from St Marys to Ropes Creek
 The Sandown Line from Rosehill to Sandown.
 The Warwick Farm Racecourse Line from Warwick Farm to Warwick Farm Racecourse

Parts of the Carlingford and Sandown lines will be converted to become a dedicated corridor for the Parramatta Light Rail, most of the Carlingford Line as part of the light rail service, and Sandown Line being used in part to connect it to a light rail depot.

Proposed and under construction

The following lines are under construction:

Parramatta Light Rail between Westmead station and Sydney Olympic Park scheduled to open in stages from 2023
Sydney Metro City & Southwest, the second stage of Sydney Metro network, between Chatswood and Bankstown scheduled to open in 2024.
Western Sydney Airport line, between St Marys and Western Sydney Airport.
 Sydney Metro West, between the Sydney CBD and Westmead via Inner West suburbs.

Underground sections

Sydney has four underground lines. These sections of railway are extensions of suburban main line commuter services and are not a completely segregated true metro system. The underground sections, especially the City Circle, typically have frequent services. Sydney Metro forms the largest part of Sydney's underground railways and the first subway system in an Australian city.

The oldest is the main city loop, the City Circle, which runs between Central, Town Hall, Wynyard, Circular Quay, St James station and Museum stations. Central and Circular Quay are above-ground stations (Circular Quay is elevated, directly underneath the Cahill Expressway), while the remainder are below ground. The line to St. James station and Museum was opened in 1926, but Circular Quay was a "missing link" until 1956. The "western limb" of the City Circle through Town Hall and Wynyard to Sydney Harbour Bridge opened in 1932, in conjunction with the opening of the Sydney Harbour Bridge. 
The second, the Eastern Suburbs line, opened in 1979. It runs between Redfern, Central, Town Hall, Martin Place, Kings Cross, Edgecliff, Woollahra (Unused Platforms) and Bondi Junction stations. All these are underground, but there are three above-ground sections, two on viaduct and one in cutting. Most of the platforms at Redfern and Central stations are above ground, including the platforms for the City Circle, but the Eastern Suburbs line is underground. At the time of its construction, the line had been intended to finish at Kingsford but it was curtailed at Bondi Junction for political and financial reasons. In the late 1990s, there were plans to extend the line to Bondi Beach, but these have since fallen through. 
The third underground line is the Airport Line, which opened in 2000, prior to the Sydney Olympics. This serves Central, Green Square, Mascot, Domestic Airport (underneath the Domestic terminals), International Airport (underneath International terminal at Sydney Airport), and Wolli Creek. After Wolli Creek it joins the above-ground East Hills line at Turrella.
The fourth underground line is the Epping to Chatswood rail link, opened in 2009. It links Chatswood to Epping, with new underground platforms at Epping and new underground stations at Macquarie University, Macquarie Park and North Ryde. The line was intended to continue from Epping to Parramatta, incorporating the existing Carlingford line, but this section was postponed during the railway's construction because of financial reasons. A stub tunnel was constructed at the northern end of Epping station in the event that work on the remainder of the line ever resumed. In 2019, the Epping to Chatswood railway was incorporated into the new Northwest Metro, which involved converting the line's commuter rail configuration to a rapid transit system. This ended the possibility of extending the railway to Parramatta as a commuter rail line.

Disused tunnels 
Sydney has several disused tunnels. The best known of these are those leading out of St James station. There are also several disused tunnels and platforms on the Eastern Suburbs line, which like St James station provided for the possibility of four tunnels even though only two are in use. There is a stub tunnel at North Sydney railway station, north of platform 2, for a never constructed Manly to Mona Vale line.

From the top of the northern stairs to platform 10 at Redfern station it is possible to view the unfinished structure for the low-level "up" (toward Central) Southern Suburbs platforms. The associated never-used tunnels are quite complex. Immediately to the left is the (surface level) stub tunnel for the "down" Southern Suburbs track. This short tunnel exits on the northern side of Lawson Street road bridge. There are at least nine railway tunnels under the suburb of Redfern: some in use, some never used.

Platforms 26 and 27 at Central lie above the Eastern Suburbs Railway platforms and have never been used for trains. Like St. James station, these stations have stub tunnels, although they are much shorter.

There are three tunnels for the old Pyrmont goods line, not part of the passenger railway system. One runs underneath Railway Square, near the Central station railway yards. For a time, the line was used to service the Powerhouse Museum. The corridor adjacent to the tunnel is now a pedestrian pathway, the tunnel itself is disused. The second tunnel runs underneath Glebe and is now part of the Dulwich Hill light rail line from Central station (see Metropolitan Goods railway line). The third tunnel was created in 2000 when an extension to the City West Link Road through Leichhardt was built on top of a cutting. This is also now used by the light rail.

See also 

 RailCorp
 Sydney Trains
 Rail transport in New South Wales
 Rail rollingstock in New South Wales
 Proposed railways in Sydney

References

Further reading

External links
NSWRail.net
 Diagrammatic history of passenger railways in Sydney